The Diocese of Antipolo (Latin: Dioecesis Antipolensis, Filipino: Diyosesis ng Antipolo, Spanish: Diócesis de Antipolo) is an ecclesiastical territory or diocese of the Latin Church of the Catholic Church in the Philippines that comprises the Province of Rizal and the city of Marikina in Metro Manila.

On January 24, 1983, during his Angelus message, Pope John Paul II announced the creation of the Diocese of Antipolo, which would encompass the whole province of Rizal, the entire Marikina, and part of Pasig (Barangays Dela Paz, Santolan, Manggahan, Rosario, and Santa Lucia, which altogether formed the Vicariate of Santo Tomas de Villanueva, now belonging to the Diocese of Pasig).  It is an area that was previously known in the Archdiocese of Manila as the Ecclesiastical District of Eastern Rizal. The diocese was canonically established on the June 25, 1983 and is a suffragan of the said archdiocese.

The first bishop of Antipolo was Protacio G. Gungon. On December 3, 2001, he was succeeded by Crisostomo Yalung as the second bishop, followed by Gabriel V. Reyes, former Bishop of Kalibo in Aklan, as the third bishop. Bishop Reyes was assisted by the then-auxiliary and later coadjutor bishop, Francisco M. De Leon, who was named his successor and fourth bishop effective September 10, 2016.

The diocese had its First Diocesan Synod in 1993 held at Saint Michael's Retreat House in Antipolo City. The diocese has experienced some jurisdictional changes since the time the Diocese of Pasig was created, whereby six parishes within the civil boundaries of Pasig were given to the new local church, together with seven diocesan priests serving in them.

At present, the Diocese of Antipolo is considered to be one of the largest local churches in the Philippines in terms of its Catholic population. Among the 86 ecclesiastical jurisdictions present in the Philippines today, the diocese is the third largest local church in terms of its Catholic population after the Archdiocese of Cebu, and the Diocese of Malolos (Bulacan and Valenzuela City).  The population of the whole area covering the diocese is 3,650,000, of which 3,280,000 (or 90%) are Catholics. The seat or center of the diocese is the Antipolo Cathedral, one of the most popular Marian shrines in the country where the historic Canonically crowned image of Our Lady of Peace and Good Voyage (Nuestra Señora de la Paz y Buen Viaje) (the Virgin of Antipolo) is enshrined.

Ordinaries

Auxiliary Bishops
Francisco M. De Leon  - June 27, 2007 – November 21, 2015, appointed Coadjutor Bishop of Antipolo
Nolly C. Buco - July 10, 2018 – present

Vicars-General
Jose B. Cruz - 1983–1986
Mariano T. Balbago, Jr. (Ministering in the Archdiocese of Washington, D.C.) - 1986–1999
Rigoberto S. de Guzman - 1999–2018
Francisco M. de Leon - 2007–2016
Generoso A. Mediarito - 2018–present
Nolly C. Buco - 2018–present
Juan dela Cruz - present

See also
Catholic Church in the Philippines
John Paul II Minor Seminary
Diocesan Shrine and Parish of St. Joseph

References

Antipolo
Antipolo
Christian organizations established in 1983
Roman Catholic dioceses and prelatures established in the 20th century
Antipolo
Religion in Rizal